Detlev Pilger (born 29 April 1955) is a German politician. Born in Koblenz, Rhineland-Palatinate, he represents the SPD. Detlev Pilger has served as a member of the Bundestag from the state of Rhineland-Palatinate since 2013.

Life 
He became member of the bundestag after the 2013 German federal election. He is a member of the sports committee and the committee for environment, nature conservation and nuclear safety.

References

External links 

  
 Bundestag biography 

1955 births
Living people
Members of the Bundestag for Rhineland-Palatinate
Members of the Bundestag 2017–2021
Members of the Bundestag 2013–2017
Members of the Bundestag for the Social Democratic Party of Germany